Yiu Wai (姚煒, Pinyin: Yáo Wěi, Jyutping: Jiu4 Wai5) is a Chinese actress from Hong Kong. Yiu is credited with over 15 films.

Early life 

Yiu Wai was born in 1948 eldest in a family of seven.  Her father was a tailor and came to Hong Kong in the 1950s.  Yiu Wai stayed in Shanghai with two other of her siblings and came to Hong Kong later and worked in garment manufacturing in her youth.  She was gifted in music and began her singing career in the 1970s.

Relationships and marriage 
In 1978 Yiu Wai had a relationship with Cecil Chao. Their daughter is Gigi Chao.

Filmography

Films 
This is a partial list of films.
 1981 Gui ma zhi duo xing (aka "All the Wrong Clues for the Right Solution") – Mrs. Yummy
 1982 Oi yan nui san (aka "My Darling, My Goddess") – Alice / Susie
 1990 Yu zhong long (aka "Dragon in Jail")
 1992 Naked Killer (aka Chik loh go yeung) – Sister Cindy 
 1994 Deng ai de nu ren (aka "Right Here Waiting") – Da Jia Jie

References

External links
 
 You Wai at letterboxd.com
 
 Yu Wai at filmaffinity.com

1948 births
Living people
People from Shanghai
Actresses from Shanghai
20th-century Hong Kong actresses
Hong Kong film actresses